De Mol (The Mole) is a Belgian reality game show that originally aired from 6 December 1998 to 19 March 2000 and again from 19 January to 16 March 2003 on TV1 with Michiel Devlieger as host. A revival has aired since 1 February 2016 on VIER with Gilles De Coster as host. The show won the famous Rose d'Or award in 2000. The format has been licensed in 40 countries from all around the world.

Players in The Mole must work together to complete various physical and mental challenges to build up a significant prize for the winner. One of them, however, is "the Mole", a double agent hired by the producers to sabotage the efforts of the group. The Mole must be careful to avoid drawing too much suspicion to himself or herself. Using journals, players must track vast amounts of data about the person(s) they suspect of being the Mole, such as seating positions, clothing colors, minor discussion topics, and so on. The quiz at the end of each episode tests players' knowledge of the Mole, and determines by lowest score (or slowest time, in the event of a tie) who is eliminated from the game.

Format
Each series of The Mole involves a group of contestants. During each episode, the contestants participate in a number of challenges, each assigned a monetary value. However, one of these contestants has been selected by production to be the Mole; it's his or her job is to try to prevent the other players from winning challenges without revealing himself or herself to others. The Mole may be told ahead of time of how to do this or what challenges to expect, while at other times the Mole must decide whether to intervene or not.

At the end of each episode, the contestants take a quiz regarding the identity of the Mole and his or her involvement in the previous activities. The player who scores the lowest on this quiz, or was slowest to answer in case of a tie, is eliminated from the game. The winner of the game is the one that answers the most questions correctly on the final quiz given when there are only three players remaining (including the Mole).

While success in the challenges builds up potential winnings, it is also critical to stay in the game by scoring better than opponents on the quiz, usually by attempting to draw their suspicions of the Mole's identity toward oneself. Since the Mole must use subterfuge to misdirect attention from his/her attempts to derail the team, disingenuous attempts to emulate the Mole must be subtle, while still noticeable and suspicious.

Challenges
Similar to other reality shows, The Mole features challenges in which the players received money that was added to a group pot which only one person could win. However, unlike challenges in other reality shows, the ones seen on The Mole offered players ways to disrupt the game, as well as ways of disguising their betrayal.

Quiz and eliminations
The quiz is the primary device of eliminating contestants across all series. Traditionally between ten and twenty questions, the quiz asks the players to identify the Mole and several pieces of information regarding the Mole, including the Mole's activity in challenges, biographical profile, their fashion and/or culinary choices during the show, etc. The player scoring lowest on the quiz (and taking the longest time to do so, in the event of tied scores) is eliminated from the game.

Series overview 

 Notes

Locations map

International versions
In total, over 50 series/seasons of The Mole have been broadcast around the world, since its inception in 1998 in Belgium.

Legend:
 (5) Currently airing  
 (14) No longer airing

See also
 De Verraders

References

External links
 
 

1998 Belgian television series debuts
1990s Belgian television series
2000s Belgian television series
2010s Belgian television series
2020s Belgian television series
Belgian reality television series
Television franchises

1990s Belgian game shows
2000s Belgian game shows
2010s Belgian game shows
2020s Belgian game shows
Television shows filmed in France
Television shows filmed in Spain
Television shows filmed in Italy
Television shows filmed in Argentina
Television shows filmed in South Africa
Television shows filmed in Mexico
Television shows filmed in Vietnam
Television shows filmed in Greece
Television shows filmed in Germany
Television shows filmed in Arizona
Eén original programming